Björn Engholm (born 9 November 1939) is a German politician of the  Social Democratic Party (SPD). He was Federal Minister for Education and Science from 1981 to 1982, and in 1982 also Federal Minister for Food, Agriculture and Forests. From 1988 to 1993 he was the Minister-President of Schleswig-Holstein and from 1991 to 1993 the leader of the Social Democratic Party.

Engholm was educated at University of Hamburg. He was elected Minister-President of Schleswig-Holstein in 1988, in the wake of the Barschel affair/Waterkantgate: he had been spied on and was a victim of severe defamation (HIV infection, tax evasion, etc.) by the Barschel campaign. The Social Democrats won an impressive 54.2% (up almost 10%) and gained an absolute majority for the first time ever. Engholm served as President of the Bundesrat in 1988/89.

While Engholm was popular with the electorate, he was forced to resign as party leader and Minister-President in 1993 after discrepancies surfaced over the testimonies he gave in the Barschel affair (Schubladenaffäre, drawer affair). A party official had paid 50,000 Deutsche Mark (kept in a kitchen drawer) to the spy of the Barschel affair to keep the espionage a secret for several weeks, to reveal the scandal on election weekend with a bigger impact and then present Engholm as a victim.

He was succeeded by Rudolf Scharping as party chairman and by Heide Simonis as Minister-President.

Since 1964, Engholm has been married to painter Barbara Engholm (born 1940); they have two daughters.

See also
List of Minister-Presidents of Schleswig-Holstein

References

1939 births
Living people
Agriculture ministers of Germany
Education ministers of Germany
Presidents of the German Bundesrat
Members of the Bundestag for Schleswig-Holstein
Members of the Landtag of Schleswig-Holstein
Politicians from Lübeck
Ministers-President of Schleswig-Holstein
Members of the Bundestag for the Social Democratic Party of Germany
Members of the Bundestag 1980–1983
Members of the Bundestag 1976–1980
Members of the Bundestag 1972–1976
Members of the Bundestag 1969–1972
University of Hamburg alumni